Yuandong Avenue is a station on Line 2 of the Shanghai Metro. It came into operation on April 8, 2010.

The station is in Shanghai's Pudong New Area, near the junction of Huazhou Road and Yuandong Avenue, now designated as the G1503 Shanghai Ring Expressway.

References

Shanghai Metro stations in Pudong
Railway stations in China opened in 2010
Line 2, Shanghai Metro
Railway stations in Shanghai